Mira Kalyanrao Renge is Shiv Sena politician from Parbhani district, Marathwada. She was member of the 12th Maharashtra Legislative Assembly representing the Pathri Assembly Constituency.

Positions held
 2009: Elected to Maharashtra Legislative Assembly

References

External links
 Shiv Sena official website

Maharashtra MLAs 2009–2014
Living people
Shiv Sena politicians
People from Parbhani district
Marathi politicians
Year of birth missing (living people)